Milagros Abigail “Mili” Menéndez (born 23 March 1997) is an Argentine footballer who plays as a forward for Racing Club. She also played for Spanish Segunda División Pro club Granada CF in 2020, then Elche CF in 2021, and has been part of the Argentina women's national team since 2018. A successful kart racing driver as a teenager, her career began playing an Asociación de Futbol Femenino de la Provincia de Buenos Aires (AFFEBA) national tournament for General Urquiza FC of Mar del Plata before being transferred to UAI Urquiza in 2015. Menéndez signed for Racing Club for the season 2019-2020, where she came back in July 2022 upon her return from Spain.

International career
Menéndez was selected by the senior team of Argentina for the 2019 FIFA Women's World Cup. On 19 June that year, during the tournament, she scored her first international goal, in a 3–3 group stage draw against Scotland.

International goals
Scores and results list Argentina's goal tally first

References

External links

Argentine women fight against inequality in soccer Daily Herald, 7 November 2018

1997 births
Living people
Women's association football forwards
Argentine women's footballers
Sportspeople from Mar del Plata
Argentina women's international footballers
2019 FIFA Women's World Cup players
Pan American Games silver medalists for Argentina
Pan American Games medalists in football
Footballers at the 2019 Pan American Games
UAI Urquiza (women) players
Medalists at the 2019 Pan American Games
Granada CF (women) players
Argentine expatriate women's footballers
Argentine expatriate sportspeople in Spain
Expatriate women's footballers in Spain
Segunda Federación (women) players

Racing Club (women) players
Argentine female racing drivers
Argentine racing drivers